The 2000–01 FR Yugoslavia Cup was the ninth season of the FR Yugoslavia's annual football cup. The cup defenders was Red Star Belgrade, but was defeated by FK Partizan in the final.

First round
Thirty-two teams entered in the First Round. The matches were played on 9 September 2000.

|}
Note: Roman numerals in brackets denote the league tier the clubs participated in the 2000–01 season.

Second round
The 16 winners from the prior round enter this round. The matches were played on 7, 8, 9 and 22 November 2000.

|}
Note: Roman numerals in brackets denote the league tier the clubs participated in the 2000–01 season.

Quarter-finals
The eight winners from the prior round enter this round. The matches were played on 8 March and 4 April 2001.

|}
Note: Roman numerals in brackets denote the league tier the clubs participated in the 2000–01 season.

Semi-finals

Note: Roman numerals in brackets denote the league tier the clubs participated in the 2000–01 season.

Final

See also
 2000–01 First League of FR Yugoslavia
 2000–01 Second League of FR Yugoslavia

References

External links
Results on RSSSF

FR Yugoslavia Cup
Cup
Yugo